The Miller–O'Donnell House was a historic residence in Mobile, Alabama.  The two-story house was built in 1837 in the Gulf Coast Cottage style.  It featured a masonry brick ground floor with a wood-frame main floor above.  It was placed on the National Register of Historic Places on February 19, 1982, but has since been destroyed.

References

National Register of Historic Places in Mobile, Alabama
Houses in Mobile, Alabama
Houses completed in 1837
Gulf Coast cottage architecture in Alabama
Demolished buildings and structures in Alabama
Demolished but still listed on the National Register of Historic Places